The Kurrama people, also known as the Puutu Kunti Kurrama people, are an Aboriginal Australian people from the Pilbara region of Western Australia.

The Puutu Kunti Kurrama and Pinikura peoples, although of different language groups, are represented by the PKKP Aboriginal Corporation in the administration of their traditional lands.

Language

The Kurrama language is a member of the Ngayarta group of the Pama–Nyungan language family, and is closely related to Yinjtjiparnti. The language is endangered, with only an estimated 10 speakers remaining (2002).

Country
Norman Tindale estimated the extent of their lands as covering . Their eastern boundaries were around Mount McCrae, while the southern limits touched the headwaters of Duck Creek and the upper Hardey River at Rocklea. The land includes much of the higher plateaus of the Hamersley Range in the Pilbara region of Western Australia.

Native title
The Puutu Kunti Kurrama and Pinikura, who are two separate but related peoples, lodged a joint claim for recognition for each of their own countries as well as a shared area. The PKKP Aboriginal Corporation is the representative body administering the lands for both peoples.

Social organisation
Kurrama initiation required youths to undergo both circumcision and subincision.

Although each group is distinct, the Kurruma and Pinikura peoples observe common laws and customs, and share and protect much of the same land and resources.

Alternative names and spellings
 Jawunmara (Yindjibarndi exonym)
 Gurama
 Kerama, Karama, Korama
 Jana:ri

Juukan Gorge destruction

The Puutu Kunti Kurrama people, in alliance with the Pinikura in a group abbreviated as PKKP, were distressed by the destruction of a sacred and heritage site in the form of a cave in Juukan Gorge by mining giant Rio Tinto in May 2020.

Notes

Citations

Sources

(map)

External links
 

Aboriginal peoples of Western Australia
Pilbara